Syntaxin-12 is a protein that in humans is encoded by the STX12 gene.

Interactions 

STX12 has been shown to interact with PLDN.

References

Further reading

External links 
 PDBe-KB provides an overview of all the structure information available in the PDB for Human Syntaxin-12